"Angst" is a song by Swiss-Albanian rapper Loredana featuring English producer Rymez. The German-language rap song was written by Loredana and German rapper Zuna while being produced by German producer Miksu alongside Rymez.

Background and composition 

"Angst" was written by Loredana and German rapper Zuna, while being produced by English producer Rymez together with German producer Miksu.

Lyrically, it mainly see Loredana settling up with the media who "solely await her next scandal" and name dropping daily newspaper publications, such as Bild Zeitung and  Blick, who mostly picked up on her allegations of fraud in June 2019. Few of the lyrics are also dedicated to her former husband and rapper Mozzik, whom she divorced in late 2019, and asks people to treat him with due respect. Prior to its release, "Angst" was expected to be a diss track to the aforementioned rapper. Later in the song, Zefi addresses rumours of her exploiting her daughter Hana as a "weapon".

Reception 

Disregarding the lyrics, the editors of Laut.de thought the song was "pretty damn solid" and viewed the dancehall-production as an appropriate platform for the rapper to "vent her rage".

Music video 

The accompanying music video for "Angst", directed by Dominik Braz, was released to the official YouTube channel of Loredana on 6 March 2020, where it has since amassed a total of nine million views. It prominently features shots of Loredana in a see-through box surrounded by paparazzi taking pictures of her which reflects her transparent public image. The video closes out with a heart-shaped picture of her ex-husband Mozzik kissing their daughter Hana.

Personnel 

Credits adapted from Tidal and YouTube.

 Loredana Zefi – performing, songwriting, vocals
 Joshua Allery (Miksu) – composing, production
 Rymez – composing, production
 Laurin Auth – composing
 Ghassan Ramlawi (Zuna) – songwriting
 Dominik Braz – video directing
 Fati – photograph directing
 Nancho Motzer – video production
 Jennifer Bachert – video production
 Samet Kaya – production supervising

Charts

See also 
 List of number-one hits of 2020 (Austria)
 List of number-one hits of 2020 (Germany)

References 

2020 singles
2020 songs
Dancehall songs
Loredana Zefi songs
German-language songs
Song recordings produced by Miksu
Number-one singles in Austria
Number-one singles in Germany
Songs written by Loredana Zefi